Osama bin Laden, a militant and founder of Al-Qaeda in 1988, believed Muslims should kill civilians and military personnel from the United States and allied countries until they withdrew support for Israel and withdrew military forces from Islamic countries. He was indicted in United States federal court for his involvement in the 1998 U.S. embassy bombings in Dar es Salaam Tanzania and Nairobi, Kenya, and was on the U.S. Federal Bureau of Investigation's Ten Most Wanted Fugitives list.

In 1974, at the age of 17, bin Laden married his first wife Najwa Ghanem at Latakia, Syria.  Osama bin Laden married at least four other women; he fathered between 20 and 24 children.

Childhood
Osama bin Mohammed bin Awad bin Laden was born in Riyadh, Saudi Arabia. In a 1998 interview with Al Jazeera, he gave his birth date as 10 March 1957. His father was Mohammed bin Laden, from Yemen. Before World War I, Mohammed had emigrated from Hadhramaut, on the south coast of Yemen, to the Red Sea port of Jeddah, Saudi Arabia, where he began to work as a porter. Starting his own business in 1930, Mohammed built his fortune as a building contractor for the Saudi royal family during the 1950s. Though there is no definitive account of the number of children born to Mohammed bin Laden, it is generally put at 58. Mohammed bin Laden was married 22 times, although to no more than four women at a time per Sharia. Osama was the only son of Mohammed bin Laden and his tenth wife, Hamida al-Attas, née Alia Ghanem, who was born in Syria.

Bin Laden's parents divorced soon after he was born, according to Khaled M. Batarfi, a senior editor at the Al Madina newspaper in Jeddah who knew him during the 1970s. Bin Laden's mother then married a man named Muhammad al-Attas, who worked at the bin Laden company. The couple had four children, and bin Laden lived in the new household with three half-brothers and one half-sister.

Education and politicization
Osama bin Laden was raised as a devout Sunni Muslim. Bin Laden's father ensured that he was regularly attending school. Bin Laden attended schools with some Western curricula and culture. No evidence has been found that he ever received full-time education in a religious madrassa. He was likely educated for some of his primary school years in Syria and that may have been in connection to his mother's frequent visits to Latakia, Syria. By the time bin Laden was an 8th grader, "he was a solid if unspectacular student". His mother remembered that he was "not an A student. He would pass exams with average grades."

In the mid-1960s, around age 10, bin Laden briefly attended Brummana High School, a Quaker institution in Brummana, Lebanon, along with several of his half brothers. Five former administrators and students said he attended for less than a year before returning home; they did not say or recall why he left, but his leaving was not due to poor behavior or grades. Renee Bazz, a former administrative staff member, said that bin Laden went to another school in Lebanon before he attended Brummana. British comedian and journalist Dom Joly claimed on an episode of BBC's Would I Lie To You? that he attended the school with bin Laden, with Osama being a senior and Joly being in elementary school. The claim is undermined by the fact that Joly was born in 1967 and Bin Laden was in Jeddah from 1968.

He seemed to have stayed in Latakia for a period. He moved back to Jeddah in the following September. From 1968 to 1976 he attended Al Thager academy. Bin Laden was probably in the fifth or sixth grade when he began attending school. In the 1960s, King Faisal had welcomed exiled teachers from Syria, Egypt, and Jordan, so that by the early seventies it was common to find members of the Muslim Brotherhood teaching at Saudi schools and universities. During that time, bin Laden became a member of the Brotherhood and attended its political teachings during after-school Islamic study groups.

Bin Laden earned a degree in civil engineering in 1979 from King Abdulaziz University in Jeddah. Despite his major subject, at university his main interest was religion; he was involved in both interpreting the Quran and charitable work. A close friend reports, "we read Sayyid Qutb. He was the one who most affected our generation." Sayyid Qutb himself, author of Ma'alim fi-l-Tariq, or Milestones, one of the most influential tracts on the importance of jihad against all that is un-Islamic in the world, was deceased, but his brother and publicizer of his work, Muhammad Qutb, lectured regularly at the university. So did another charismatic Muslim Brotherhood member, Abdallah Azzam, an Islamic scholar from Palestine who was instrumental in building pan-Islamic enthusiasm for jihad against the Soviets in Afghanistan and in drawing Muslims (like Osama) from all over the Middle East to fight there.

Bin Laden was described by University friend Jamal Khalifa as extremely religious. Neither man watched films nor listened to popular music, because they believed such activities went against the teachings of the Qur'an. During his University career he witnessed many world-changing events, especially in 1979. First he watched the Iranian Revolution, in which Ayatollah Khomeini overthrew Iran’s Western supported government to install an Islamist state. Then he saw the seizure of the Grand Mosque in Mecca by radicals in Saudi Arabia and the Saudi government’s dependent response and reliance on Western power. It was not until the French special forces came in that the government was able to regain control of Mecca’s holiest site. Bin Laden was disgusted with his government’s lack of ability to protect the sacred city, and he began to see the royal family more and more as corrupt. Finally, he ended 1979 ready to fight off the invading Soviets in Afghanistan.

In regard to his Islamic learning, bin Laden was sometimes referred to as a "sheikh", considered by some to be "well versed in the classical scriptures and traditions of Islam", and was said to have been mentored by scholars such as Musa al-Qarni. He had no formal training in Islamic jurisprudence, however, and was criticized by Islamic scholars as having no standing to issue religious opinions (fatwa).

Bin Laden is reported to have married at least five women, although he later divorced the first two. Three of Osama bin Laden's wives were university lecturers, highly educated, from distinguished families. According to Wisal al Turabi, bin Laden married them because they were "spinsters", who "were going to go without marrying in this world. So he married them for the Word of God".  His known wives were:

Najwa Ghanhem (born 1960), a Syrian, also known as Umm Abdullah (mother of Abdullah).  Najwa was "promised" in marriage to bin Laden. Bin Laden married her in 1974 in Latakia in northwestern Syria.  After the birth of their first son, Abdullah, they moved from his mother's house to a building in the Al-Aziziyah district of Jeddah.  She is the mother of Saad bin Laden, as well as at least 10 more children. She co-authored Growing Up bin Laden with her son Omar. Her children did not like life in Khartoum and even less life in Afghanistan. She left bin Laden around 2001, about the same time as his marriage to Amal al-Sadah.  She returned to Syria and was last reported living in Latakia.  Her father is the brother of bin Laden's mother, Hamida al-Attas (born Alia Ghanem).
Khadijah Sharif, also known as Umm Ali (mother of Ali).  She was a university lecturer who studied and worked in Saudi Arabia.  Umm Ali bin Laden spent holidays in Khartoum, Sudan, where bin Laden later settled during his exile in the years 1991 to 1996. According to Wisal al Turabi, the wife of Sudanese politician Hassan Turabi, Umm Ali taught Islam to some families in Riyadh, an upscale neighborhood in Khartoum. According to Abu Jandal, bin Laden's former chief bodyguard, while living in Sudan, Umm Ali asked bin Laden for a divorce because she said that she "could not continue to live in an austere way and in hardship".
Khairiah Saber, also known as Umm Hamza (mother of Hamza).  A child psychologist with a PhD in Islamic studies, she was reportedly bin Laden's favorite wife, and the most mature, being seven years his senior. She had only one child, a son. Though she had a frail constitution and was not beautiful, she was from "a wealthy and distinguished family", exuded a "regal quality", and "was deeply committed to the jihadi cause".  News reports suggest that she was living in bin Laden's compound in Abbottabad, Pakistan at the time of bin Laden's death.
Siham Sabar, also known as Umm Khaled (mother of Khaled). A teacher of Arabic grammar, she kept her university job and commuted to Saudi Arabia during their time in Sudan.  News reports suggest that she was living in bin Laden's compound in Abbottabad, Pakistan at the time of bin Laden's death.
Amal Ahmed al-Sadah (born March 27, 1982) was bin Laden's youngest wife. Born Amal Ahmed Abdulfattah in Yemen, she married bin Laden in 2000. The marriage between Amal al-Sadah and bin Laden was apparently part of a "political arrangement" between bin Laden and "an important Yemeni tribe, meant to boost al-Qaeda recruitment in Yemen". Amal al-Sadah was identified as living in the compound in Abbottabad, Pakistan at the time of bin Laden's death, along with Siham Sabar and Khairiah Sabar, the other two wives of bin Laden.  She was injured in the calf in the raid.  Bin Laden commissioned Rashad Mohammed Saeed Ismael to choose the bride and arrange the marriage.

On 27 April 2012, BBC News reported that the three widows as well as eleven children of Osama bin Laden were deported to Saudi Arabia from the Pakistani capital, Islamabad. However, since the youngest of his widows, Amal Ahmed al-Sadah, is a Yemeni, it is believed that she will travel on to Yemen.

Children

Bin Laden fathered between 20 and 24 children. The children of his first wife, Najwa, include Abdallah (born c. 1976), Omar, Saad and Mohammed. His son Mohammed Babrak bin Laden (born c. 1983) married the daughter of the former al-Qaeda military chief Mohammed Atef (also called Abu Haf) in January 2001, at Kandahar.

Appearance and behavior

Interviewees of Lawrence Wright, on the other hand, described him as quite slender, but not particularly tall. He had an olive complexion, was left-handed, and usually walked with a cane. He wore a plain white turban and did not wear the traditional Saudi male headdress, generally white.

In terms of personality, bin Laden was described as a soft-spoken, mild mannered man. His soft voice was also a function of necessity. Interviews with reporters had reportedly left his vocal cords inflamed and bin Laden unable to speak the following day. His bodyguard contended Soviet chemical weapons were to blame for this malady; reporters have speculated that kidney disease was the cause.

The author Adam Robinson has alleged that bin Laden supported Arsenal Football Club, visiting the team's stadium twice when he visited London in 1994.

Bin Laden's "wealth and generosity ... simplicity of ... behaviour, personal charm and ... bravery in battle" have been described as "legendary." According to Michael Scheuer, bin Laden claims to speak only Arabic. In a 1998 interview, he had the English questions translated into Arabic. But others, such as Rhimaulah Yusufzai and Peter Bergen, believe he understood English.

Bin Laden had been praised for his self-denial, despite his great wealth – or former great wealth. While living in Sudan, a lamb was slaughtered and cooked every evening at his home for guests, but bin Laden "ate very little himself, preferring to nibble what his guests left on their plates, believing that these abandoned morsels would gain the favor of God."

Bin Laden was said to have "consciously modeled himself" since childhood "on certain features of the Prophet's life", using "the fingers of his right hand," rather than a spoon when eating, believing it to be sunnah: "the way the Prophet did it, ... choosing to fast on the days that Prophet fasted, to wear clothes similar to those the Prophet may have worn, even to sit and to eat in the same postures that tradition ascribes to him."

At the same time, other actions of his were motivated by concern for appearances. Bin Laden was known for his media savvy, using the Islamic imagery of the cave in Tora Bora "as a way of identifying himself with the prophet in the minds of many Muslims," despite the fact the caves in question were tunnels dug with the modern technology of earth moving machinery to store ammunition. He had dyed his beard to cover the streaks of gray. In 2001 he restaged a recitation of a poem intended for Arab television when he was not satisfied with the original video results done before an audience at his son's wedding dinner. The second take, done the next day after the wedding was over, had a handful of supporters crying in praise to simulate the noise of the full room the day before.  "His image management extended to asking one of the reporters, who had taken a digital snapshot, to take another picture because his neck was 'too full'".

References

External links

Osama in America: The Final Answer by Steve Coll, The New Yorker, June 30, 2009
Osama Bin Laden's Beginnings – video report by National Geographic

Osama bin Laden
Binladen
Binladen